Setia is a District of Southwest Aceh Regency in Aceh Province, Indonesia.

References

See also
 Southwest Aceh Regency
 Aceh

Southwest Aceh Regency